Adrian Breen may refer to:

Adrian Breen (hurler) (born 1992), Irish hurler
Adrian Breen (quarterback) (born 1965), American football quarterback